The 2013 Kagame Interclub Cup was the 38th edition of the Kagame Interclub Cup, which is organised by CECAFA. It began on 18 June and ended on 1 July 2013. Sudan hosted the tournament for the fifth time since it officially began in 1974. Vital'O, who have won the Burundi Premier League a record 18 times, beat Primus National Football League side Armée Patriotique Rwandaise to win the tournament for the first time in their history. Prior to the beginning of the competition, clubs from Kenya, South Sudan and Tanzania withdrew from the tournament due to security concerns.

Participants
On 22 May 2013, the draw for clubs to participate in the tournament was released. Due to dropouts the fixtures and group draws were amended only on 15 July, three days before the tournament. 

Group A
 Al-Merreikh Al-Fasher
 Armée Patriotique Rwandaise
 Elman
 Vital'O

Group B
 Rayon Sports
 Express
 Port
 Elect-Sport (invitee)

Group C
 Al-Ahly Shendi
 Al-Hilal Kaduqli
 Uganda Revenue Authority

Group stage
The group stage featured eleven teams, with 4 teams in Group A and B and only three in Group C. Three teams advanced from Group A and B and two from Group C.

If two or more teams are equal on points on completion of the group matches, the following criteria are applied to determine the rankings (in descending order):

 Number of points obtained in games between the teams involved;
 Goal difference in games between the teams involved;
 Goals scored in games between the teams involved;
 Away goals scored in games between the teams involved;
 Goal difference in all games;
 Goals scored in all games;
 Drawing of lots.

Group A
Results:

Group B
Results:

Group C
Results:

Knockout stage
In the knockout stage, teams play against each other once. The losers of the semi-finals played against each other in a third place playoff where the winner was placed third overall in the entire competition.

References

External links
Knockout stage results

Kagame Interclub Cup
Kagame Interclub Cup
2013 in Sudanese sport
International association football competitions hosted by Sudan